Binn Mhór (Irish for "great peak") is one of the Maumturk Mountains of Connemara in County Galway, Ireland. At , it is the third-highest of the Maumturks, the 140th-highest peak in Ireland on the Arderin list, and 171st-highest on the Vandeleur-Lynam list.  Binn Mhór is on the southern side of the pass of Máméan, on a small massif that includes Mullach Glas and Corcogemore; this massif is at the far southeastern sector of the long north-west to south-east spine of the Maumturks.

Naming

Irish academic Paul Tempan records that Binn Mhór has also been called "Shannakeala".

Geography
Binn Mhór lies on a small massif in the southeast sector of the Maumturks range, separated from the main range by a deep east-west mountain pass called Máméan.  Máméan has been a site of pilgrimage dedicated to Saint Patrick since the 5th century, and several historical items are dug into the lower southerly slopes of Binn Chaonaigh, on the northern side of Máméan, including a holy well, a cleft in the rock known as Saint Patrick's Bed where the saint reputedly slept, a circle of stones for the Stations of the Cross, and a Mass Rock.

Binn Mhór's massif has a high east-west ridge with three subsidiary peaks. To the west, and directly overlooking Máméan, is the subsidiary summit of Binn Mhór West Top  or Binn Ramhar, whose prominence of  qualifies it as an Arderin Beg. To the east along the ridge are the subsidiary summits of Binn Mhór NE Top, whose prominence of  qualifies it as an Vandeleur-Lynam; and Binn Mhór East Top, whose prominence of only  means it does not qualify on any recognised scale.

Further east along the ridge of Binn Mhor's massif lie the peaks of Mullach Glas and Corcogemore.

Binn Mhór's |prominence of  qualifies it as a Marilyn, and it also ranks as the 89th-highest mountain in Ireland on the MountainViews Online Database, 100 Highest Irish Mountains, where the minimum prominence is 100 metres.

Hill walking

The most straightforward route to the summit of Binn Mhór is the 6-kilometre 2-hour roundtrip route from the pass at Máméan and back; however, because of its positioning on a high ridge of its own small massif, it can also be climbed as a 10-kilometre 4–5 hour route from Corcogemore in the west, across Mullach Ghlas, to the summit of Binn Mhor, and then finishing down at Máméan (e.g. the route requires two cars).

Binn Mhór is also climbed as part of the Maamturks Challenge, a 25-kilometre 10–12 hour walk over the full Maumturks range (from Maam Cross to Leenaun), which is considered one of the "great classic ridge-walks of Ireland", but of "extreme grade" due to the circa 7,600 feet of total ascent.  Since 1975, the University College Galway Mountaineering Club has run the annual "Maamturks Challenge Walk" (MCW), and man a checkpoint in the Máméan pass; climbers descend from Binn Mhór at 661 metres to Máméan at only 150 metres, before re-ascending to Binn Chaonaigh at 633 metres.

Gallery

Bibliography

See also

Twelve Bens, major range in Connemara
Mweelrea, major range in Killary Harbour
Lists of mountains in Ireland
Lists of mountains and hills in the British Isles
List of Marilyns in the British Isles
List of Hewitt mountains in England, Wales and Ireland

References

External links
The Maamturks Challenge, University College Galway Mountaineering Club
The Maamturks Challenge: Routecard (2015)
MountainViews: The Irish Mountain Website, Binn Mhor
MountainViews: Irish Online Mountain Database
The Database of British and Irish Hills , the largest database of British Isles mountains ("DoBIH")
Hill Bagging UK & Ireland, the searchable interface for the DoBIH

Marilyns of Ireland
Hewitts of Ireland
Mountains and hills of County Galway
Mountains under 1000 metres